David Lawrence Rimoin (November 9, 1936 – May 27, 2012) was a Canadian American geneticist.  He was especially noted for his research into the genetics of skeletal dysplasia (dwarfism), inheritable diseases such as Tay–Sachs disease, and diabetes.

Biography
Rimoin was born in Montreal, the son of Fay (Lecker) and Michael Rimoin. Rimoin attended college and medical school at McGill University, where he received his bachelor's degree in 1957, followed by a medical degree and a Master of Science in genetics in 1961.  He followed with internships and residencies at Royal Victoria Hospital in Montreal and at Johns Hopkins Hospital in Baltimore, where he studied under genetics pioneer Victor A. McKusick and received a Ph.D in medical genetics. He spent three years at the Washington University School of Medicine in St. Louis, Missouri where his first daughter Anne Walsh Rimoin was born.  His 1970 study of diabetes mellitus challenged the then-prevailing consensus that diabetes was a single disorder, and showed instead that it could have multiple genetic causes.

In 1970 Rimoin moved to Harbor-UCLA Medical Center in Los Angeles, where he became chief of the division of medical genetics.  He moved to Cedars-Sinai Medical Center in 1986.  He founded the International Skeletal Dysplasia Registry.  Together with Michael Kaback, he organized a California Tay-Sachs screening program that became a national model. Rimoin and English geneticist Alan E. H. Emery co-edited Principles and Practice of Medical Genetics, first published in 1983 and now considered an essential textbook on the subject.  At Cedars-Sinai he was chair of the pediatrics practice, established an adult genetics program, and began a screening program focused on genetic diseases within Los Angeles' large population of Persian Jews.

Dr. David Rimoin was mentioned in Frederick Drimmer's book "Very Special People". It stated that he had found that growth hormone could help pituitary dwarfs achieve close to normal height. Obtained from the pituitaries of human cadavers, it had not been available in sufficient supply.

In 1997–98, Rimoin was the first president of the American College of Medical Genetics and Genomics After his death, the ACMG established two awards in his honor, the David L. Rimoin Lifetime Achievement Award in Medical Genetics and the David L. Rimoin Inspiring Excellence Award.

Rimoin died in Los Angeles on May 27, 2012, days after having been diagnosed with pancreatic cancer. He is survived by his second wife, Ann Garber Rimoin, his two daughters Anne Rimoin and Lauren Rimoin and his son Michael Rimoin.

References

External links
Interview with David L. Rimoin, UCLA Oral History of Human Genetics Project (accessed 2012-06-01).

1936 births
2012 deaths
American geneticists
Canadian geneticists
Medical geneticists
Physicians from Montreal
McGill University Faculty of Medicine alumni
Johns Hopkins School of Medicine alumni
Deaths from cancer in California
Deaths from pancreatic cancer
Physicians of the Cedars-Sinai Medical Center
20th-century Canadian biologists
20th-century American biologists
20th-century Canadian physicians
20th-century American physicians
Canadian emigrants to the United States
Members of the National Academy of Medicine